Stenosphecia is a monotypic genus of moths in the family Sesiidae. Its sole species is Stenosphecia columbica. Both genus and species were described in 1917 by Ferdinand Le Cerf. It is found in the Neotropical realm.

Original publication

References

Sesiidae
Monotypic moth genera